Daniel Rudslätt (born  in Huddinge) is a retired Swedish professional ice hockey player. Rudslätt was acquired by AIK in 2010 and signed to a two year-contract with AIK, which expired after the 2011–12 Elitserien season. Rudslätt has also played in Brynäs IF and Djurgårdens IF Hockey and won the Elitserien playoffs with both teams. Rudslätt's youth team is Kallhälls IF.

Career statistics

References 
 

Living people
1974 births
AIK IF players
Brynäs IF players
Djurgårdens IF Hockey players
Kölner Haie players
Swedish ice hockey left wingers
Swedish expatriate ice hockey players in Germany
Wings HC Arlanda players